Heritage High School is a public high school located approximately  outside the city of Maryville, in Blount County, Tennessee, USA, which opened in 1977. It was created through the consolidation of four community high schools (Townsend, Walland, Porter and Everett) into a comprehensive high school.

Heritage High School is one of two secondary schools operated by Blount County Schools. Two other public high schools in Blount County that are operated by the cities of Maryville and Alcoa.

The school provides education primarily to students from Townsend, Walland, Louisville, Rockford and Alcoa communities.

In the 2009–2010 school year, the student population at Heritage was  94.62% White, 2.84% Latino, 1.87% African-American, 0.06% Native Hawaiian-Pacific Islander, and 0.42% Asian.

Campus
The high school occupies a  campus within  of the Great Smoky Mountains National Park.

There are scenic views of the park's peaks and nearby Walland Gap that divides the Chilhowee Mountain range into two sections.

Heritage High School occupies two main educational buildings. The Main school building consists of three two-story academic wings containing counseling and office suites, a sizable common area, theater, gymnasium with locker rooms and additional class space for physical education, art and band along the gymnasium perimeter. A covered walkway leads to the vocational education building with large class space for vocational training programs.

Athletic facilities include the James D. Lillard Field/Jack Renfro Stadium utilized for American football and track & field. Additional athletic facilities include a soccer field, side-by-side baseball and softball facilities, exterior hard tennis courts and a large gymnasium used for basketball, volleyball and wrestling competition. Located adjacent to stadium is the Wilbur Shoun Athletic Fieldhouse used primarily for weight training.

Also present on campus is the Heritage Planetarium whose programs were utilized by local schools and general public. The Planetarium is attached by breezeway to the main school building. The planetarium was closed on September 23, 2010, following conflict between Director Thomas Webber and Blount County School Board on the Planetarium's direction, budget and the director's salary reduction. There are no current plans to reopen the facility as Webber resigned his position.

Faculty
Heritage's faculty consists of 104 members. 1% of the faculty possess Ed. D. Degree, 16% have an Ed. S. degree, 5% have a master's degree+45, 47% have a master's degree and the remaining 31% have a bachelor's degree.

Student life
Most students begin their class day at 8:30am. As Heritage utilizes block scheduling, there are five 70-minute class periods per school day. Before the school 2011-2012 year, the block schedule used four 90-minute class periods.

There is an early class option for seniors who wish to graduate early or need extra credit to graduate on time. These early classes begin at 7:00am and end at 8:00am.

In 2006, Blount County Schools created a freshman academy at Heritage High School that provides faculty and administrative personnel solely devoted to first-year student development.

The Heritage High School marching band, known as the Marching Mountaineers, earns superior ratings at most competitions. The band program hosts the annual Volunteer Classic Band Festival every October at James D. Lillard Field/ Jack Renfro Stadium.

Heritage High School choral groups have earned superior ratings at state and national-level competitions. They prospered under the direction of Chris Clift, the President of the ETVA until 2018, when Heritage alumni Tyler Owens continued the success of the program.

Sports
Heritage competes primarily in the Tennessee Secondary School Athletic Association in the largest division in each sport. The Mountaineers and Lady Mountaineers field teams in:

American Football
Baseball
Basketball
Bowling
Cross country
Golf
Soccer
Softball
Swimming
Tennis
Track and field
Volleyball
Wrestling

Extracurricular activities
Heritage has numerous state and nationally recognized clubs and organizations, including:

4-H
United States Air Force Junior ROTC
Band (both marching and concert)
Cheerleading
Choir (both men's, women's, acapella Vocal Impact, and Honors Heritage Singers)
Computer Club
Distributive Education Clubs of America
Future Business Leaders of America
Fellowship of Christian Athletes
FCCLA
Future Farmers of America
Key Club
Speech and Drama
Yearbook
HOSA
National Honor Society
Youth in Government
Skills USA
Student Council
United States Academic Decathlon/Academic Bowl

Notable alumni
Jennifer Higdon, Grammy and Pulitzer Prize winning classical composer
Melanie Hutsell, actress and Saturday Night Live alumna

References

External links
  Mountaineer Press Newsletter
 Heritage High School gradecard provided by Tennessee Department of Education
 Heritage High School profile provided by greatschool.org
  Heritage High School profile provided by schooltree.org
  Tennessee School Improvement Plan; Nov. 2009
 Heritage High School earns $100,000 from US Cellular from Knoxville News-Sentinel

Public high schools in Tennessee
Schools in Blount County, Tennessee
Maryville, Tennessee
1977 establishments in Tennessee